The character   (lowercase: ⟨ɂ⟩) called glottal stop, is an alphabetic letter in some Latin alphabets, most notably in several languages of Canada where it indicates a glottal stop sound. Such usage derives from phonetic transcription, for example the International Phonetic Alphabet (IPA), that use this letter for the glottal stop sound. The letter derives graphically from use of the apostrophe  or the symbol ʾ for glottal stop.

Graphic variants

Where  is not available, not being in the basic Latin alphabet, it is sometimes replaced by a question mark , which is its official representation in the SAMPA transcription scheme. In Skwomesh or Squamish,  may be replaced by the digit  (see image at right).

In Unicode, four graphic variants of the glottal stop letter are available.

 Unicase  is provided for the International Phonetic Alphabet and Americanist phonetic notation. It is found in a number of orthographies that use the IPA/APA symbol, such as those of several Salishan languages. 
 A case pair, uppercase  and lowercase , is provided for the orthographies of several Athabaskan languages. Uppercase  may be slightly wider than unicase  in fonts that distinguish them. 
 Superscript  that is used in the IPA and the Uralic Phonetic Alphabet.

Other notations

Other common symbols for the glottal stop sound are variants of the punctuation mark apostrophe that was the historical basis of the glottal stop letters. These include the 9-shaped modifier letter apostrophe, which is probably the most common (and the direct ancestor of ), the 6-shaped ʻokina of Hawaiian, and the straight-apostrophe shaped saltillo of many languages of Mexico, which has the case forms .

Usage

Technical transcription
 Americanist phonetic notation and the International Phonetic Alphabet—unicase ʔ or superscript ˀ
 Transcription of Australian Aboriginal languages—occasionally unicase ʔ
 Uralic Phonetic Alphabet—superscript ˀ only

Vernacular orthographies
 Languages of Canada
 Chipewyan—uppercase Ɂ and lowercase ɂ
 Dogrib—uppercase Ɂ and lowercase ɂ
 Kootenai—unicase ʔ
 Musqueam language—unicase ʔ
 Nootka—unicase ʔ
 Slavey—uppercase Ɂ and lowercase ɂ
 Nitinaht—unicase ʔ
 Thompson—unicase ʔ
 Lushootseed—unicase ʔ

Computing codes 
In Unicode 1.0, only the unicase and superscript variants were included. In version 4.1 (2005), an uppercase character was added, and the existing unicase character was redefined as its lowercase. Then, in version 5.0 (2006), it was decided to separate the cased and caseless usages by adding a dedicated lowercase letter. The IPA character is first from left, while the extended Latin alphabet characters are third and fourth from left.

See also

 Glottal stop#Writing
 ʾ (Modifier letter right half ring)
 ʕ (Voiced pharyngeal fricative in IPA)
 ʡ (Epiglottal stop in IPA)
 ʢ (Voiced epiglottal trill in IPA)
 ʖ and ƾ (Obsolete and nonstandard symbols in the International Phonetic Alphabet)
 ˤ (Pharyngealization in IPA)
 ʻOkina
 Aleph
 Apostrophe
 Hamza
 Saltillo (letter)
 Sokuon
 Spiritus lenis

References

External links 
 

Glottal stop